The water polo events at the 2003 World Aquatics Championships were held from 13 to 26 July 2003, in Barcelona, Spain.

Medal summary

Medal table

Medalists

References

 
2003
World Aquatics Championships
Water polo